Lymire nitens is a moth of the subfamily Arctiinae. It was described by Rothschild in 1912. It is found in Venezuela.

The length of the forewings is about 20 mm. The forewings are black-brown with a broad cinnamon-buff oblique band beyond the cell. The hindwings are black, very strongly glossed with purple.

References

Euchromiina
Moths described in 1912